General elections were held on Ascension Island on 20 October 2022 to elect the Island Council, following the dissolution of the previous Council on 1 September. Six candidates ran for five available Councillor positions. Initially scheduled for 22 September 2022, the election was postponed as there were not enough valid nominated candidates to fill all the available seats.

Electoral system
The Island Council consists of either five or seven elected members, depending on the number of candidates. If there are eight or more candidates, seven members would be elected; if there were fewer than eight candidates, only five would be elected. With only six candidates running, five seats were available.

The five seats were elected for three years terms by plurality-at-large voting. Voters were able to cast up to five votes.

Results

References

Elections in Ascension Island
Ascension
Ascension
Election and referendum articles with incomplete results